The List of shipwrecks in 1773 includes some ships sunk, wrecked or otherwise lost during 1773.

January

4 January

15 January

17 January

19 January

20 January

24 January

25 January

29 January

30 January

Unknown date

February

1 February

2 February

7 February

9 February

18 February

22 February

23 February

24 February

26 February

Unknown date

March

8 March

10 March

21 March

24 March

Unknown date

April

1 April

7 April

14 April

Unknown date

May

4 May

10 May

11 May

16 May

29 May

Unknown date

June

1 June

Unknown date

July

Unknown date

August

13 August

18 August

28 August

Unknown date

September

2 September

7 September

8 September

11 September

15 September

20 September

22 September

23 September

Unknown date

October

4 October

8 October

10 October

12 October

27 October

29 October

30 October

Unknown date

November

6 November

11 November

12 November

15 November

16 November

17 November

18 November

24 November

Unknown date

December

8 December

9 December

17 December

19 December

26 December

Unknown date

Unknown date

References

1773